KBGL (106.9 FM) is a radio station broadcasting a Top 40/CHR format, licensed to Larned, Kansas. The station is currently owned by Eagle Communications.

On August 22, 2012, at 5 a.m., KBGL switched from oldies (as "106.9 The Beagle") to Top 40, branded as "Hits 106.9".

References

External links

BGL
Contemporary hit radio stations in the United States
Radio stations established in 2001
2001 establishments in Kansas